SynbiCITE is the UK's national Innovation and Knowledge Centre (IKC) for the adoption and use of synthetic biology by industry. It also helps to incubate new businesses by providing them with space and accelerator programs, including funding, training and mentoring.

History 
SynbiCITE was created in 2013 after a UK-wide competition between potential IKC-host universities to find the most suitable host with the best strategic plan. The organization was initially funded to run for five years by the government and other partners, with the intention that it would become self-sustaining by 2018. In April 2016, SynbiCITE opened the Synthetic Biology Foundry, a Research Councils UK-funded facility providing remote gene design, construction, and validation services using laboratory robotics. Based on a similar facility at MIT, it is the first commercial facility using laboratory automation to provide on-demand services specifically for synthetic biology in the United Kingdom.

In 2019, the DNA Foundry opened at Imperial College London's White City Campus.  The facility's goal is to enable the outsourcing of DNA manufacture, design, and testing for businesses and accelerate the development of DNA-based technologies in the UK. SynbiCITE also supported the development of OpenCell, which provides affordable biotechnology labs using shipping containers in White City.

Organisation 

SynbiCITE is headquartered at Imperial College London. It is funded by a public-private partnership between the EPSRC, BBSRC, and Innovate UK, as well as several industrial and private investors. It is run and managed by a board consisting of two co-directors (Professor Richard Kitney and Professor Paul Freemont).

References

Engineering and Physical Sciences Research Council
Genetic engineering in the United Kingdom
Organisations associated with Imperial College London
Laboratories in the United Kingdom
Synthetic biology